Donovan Wayne Porterie (born May 29, 1987) is an American football quarterback who is currently a free agent. He was signed by the Fairbanks Grizzlies as an undrafted free agent in 2011. He played college football at New Mexico.

Porterie signed with the New Mexico Stars of the Lone Star Football League (LSFL) for the 2014 season, but later decided against playing with the team to pursue a higher level of play.

Porterie signed with the Spokane Shock to help replace 2013 AFL MVP, Erik Meyer. In Porterie's Spokane debut he threw 5 touchdowns and 4 interceptions in a 52–41 loss to the Pittsburgh Power.

In January 2015, Porterie signed with the Green Bay Blizzard.

On September 16, 2015, Porterie signed with the Iowa Barnstormers.

On January 19, 2017, Porterie signed with the Duke City Gladiators of Champions Indoor Football (CIF). That same year, he was named League MVP of the season, completing 249 of 398 passes, and accumulating 2,784 passing yards and 60 touchdowns, 3 of which were rushing touchdowns.

References

External links
New Mexico Lobos bio
Arena Football League bio

1987 births
Living people
American football quarterbacks
New Mexico Lobos football players
Sioux City Bandits players
Fairbanks Grizzlies players
Green Bay Blizzard players
New Mexico Stars players
Spokane Shock players
Iowa Barnstormers players
Duke City Gladiators players